The Saint Vincent and the Grenadines Olympic Committee (IOC code: VIN) is the National Olympic Committee (NOC) representing Saint Vincent and the Grenadines. It is also the body responsible for Saint Kitts and Nevis' representation at the Commonwealth Games.

History 
Saint Vincent and The Grenadines Olympic Committee was founded in 1982 and recognised by the International Olympic Committee in 1987.

See also
Saint Vincent and the Grenadines at the Olympics
Saint Vincent and the Grenadines at the Commonwealth Games

References

External links
 Official website

Saint Vincent and the Grenadines
Saint Vincent and the Grenadines
Olympic
Saint Vincent and the Grenadines at the Olympics
1982 establishments in Saint Vincent and the Grenadines
Sports organizations established in 1982